Independenţa may refer to several places in Romania:

 Independența, a commune in Călărași County
 Independența, a commune in Constanța County
 Independența, a commune in Galați County
 Independența, a village in Gherghița Commune, Prahova County
 Murighiol, a commune in Tulcea County, called Independența from 1983 to 1996

A ship 
 M/T Independența, a Romanian crude carrier, which burnt and sank due to a catastrophic accident after collision in  Bosphorus, Turkey.